Ahn Jung-hwan (or  ; born 27 January 1976) is a South Korean former football player and television personality. Ahn played for South Korea as a second striker and scored a total of three goals in two FIFA World Cups, including a golden goal against Italy. After his retirement as a footballer, he became an entertainer and a football commentator.

Early life 
Ahn was selected for South Korean under-20 team for the 1994 AFC Youth Championship. Three years later, he also played the 1997 Summer Universiade for South Korean Universiade team, winning a silver medal.

Playing career

Busan Daewoo Royals 
In 1998, Ahn started his professional career in a K League club Busan Daewoo Royals. He was selected as one of the K League Best XI in that year after showing great performance as soon as he went there. The next year, in 1999, he was named the K League Most Valuable Player by leading his team to finish as a runner-up in the K League.

Loan to Perugia 
In 2000, Ahn joined Perugia on loan, becoming the first South Korean footballer to play in Italy's Serie A. However, he was ostracised by the team's captain Marco Materazzi and teammates. He made 30 appearances (including 13 starts) and five goals for two Serie A seasons in a racist environment. Afterwards, he was named in South Korean squad for the 2002 FIFA World Cup, hosted by his country.

In a group match against the United States, Ahn imitated a speed skater during his goal celebration after scoring the equaliser in order to protest the controversial disqualification of Korean short track speed skater Kim Dong-sung in the 1500 metres at the 2002 Winter Olympics, which allowed American Apolo Ohno to win the gold medal. During the round of 16 against Italy, Ahn missed a penalty, but later scored a golden goal in extra-time from a header that sent the South Koreans through to the quarter-finals.

The next day, Perugia owner Luciano Gaucci cancelled his contract and was quoted as saying, "I have no intention of paying a salary to someone who has ruined Italian football" due to the fact of the controversial and arguable win of the South Korean side. Gaucci stated that his decision was not due to the goal, alleging comments by Ahn about the Italian nation. However, Gaucci later took back what he had said, and approved the £1.2 million option to sign Ahn on a permanent basis. Ahn rejected the offer of a three-year contract and refused to turn up for pre-season training despite Perugia claiming ownership of his registration, saying "I will no longer discuss my transfer to Perugia, who attacked my character instead of congratulating me for a goal in the World Cup." Busan Daewoo Royals also claimed that they had not been paid by Perugia. A number of European clubs were interested in Ahn, but gave up on him due to his conflict with Perugia. Finally, FIFA forced Perugia's hand by concluding Ahn had to pay Perugia $3.5 million to compensate for their damage in the transfer market, and so he contracted with a Japanese entertainment company, the Professional Management (PM), to pay off his debts. He spent his important period as a J1 League player and an entertainer for three years.

MSV Duisburg 

After a successful spell in Japan, Ahn returned to Europe to play for French Ligue 1 team Metz in July 2005 and scored two goals in 16 outings. In January 2006, Ahn was invited to train with Blackburn Rovers but twice failed to show up, one of the dates being his birthday. In February, he secured a 17-month deal with a Bundesliga club MSV Duisburg to adapt to the environment of Germany, the host of the 2006 FIFA World Cup.

Ahn scored two goals in 12 outings, and his club was relegated from the Bundesliga. He was interested in a move to Heart of Midlothian of the Scottish Premier League, but it fell through.

Ahn was selected for the South Korean squad for the 2006 World Cup. He scored the winning goal after coming off the bench during the second half of the South Korean opening match, where they beat Togo 2–1. Thus, he became the Asian all-time scoring leader at the World Cup with three goals. He was released by Duisburg after the World Cup, and returned to South Korea, joining Suwon Samsung Bluewings on a one-year deal in January 2007.

Retirement 
Ahn scored a hat-trick in a game of the 2007 Korean League Cup against Daejeon Citizen. However, his poor performance became longer, and he was left out of the national team for the 2007 AFC Asian Cup.

In 2008, Ahn returned to Busan IPark, formerly Busan Daewoo Royals. He steadily improved his game and overall performances and, for the first time in 22 months, was recalled to the national team for the 2010 FIFA World Cup qualifications match against Jordan.

In March 2009, Ahn signed a three-month contract with Chinese Super League side Dalian Shide. He became the key player in the club and extended his contract to December 2010 with Dalian Shide in June, though J2 League club Oita Trinita had an intention to sign him. He was promoted to Dalian's captain in the 2010 season.

Ahn officially announced his retirement on 30 January 2012.

Personal life
Ahn is sometimes called "The Lord of the Ring" by Korean fans. He married former Miss Korea Lee Hye-won in 2001 and got this nickname by kissing her ring after every goal he scores.

Other than football, Ahn is noted for his model-like looks and has appeared in numerous make-up ads. The Korean media often states the similar facial appearance between the footballer and actor Cha In-pyo. Both view the statement as a compliment.

Ahn was one of the carriers of the Olympic flame at the opening of the 2018 Winter Olympics.

On 15 November 2021, Ahn founded the Matched Project (MCP) agency with Kim Young-man, Kim Sung-joo, and Jung Hyung-don.

Philanthropy 
On February 22, 2023, Ahn donated 100 million won from YouTube to
Save the Children.

Career statistics

Club

International

Results list South Korea's goal tally first.

Filmography

Television

Music video

Honours

Player
Busan Daewoo Royals
Korean League Cup: 1998

Yokohama F. Marinos
J1 League: 2004

South Korea B
Summer Universiade silver medal: 1997
East Asian Games: 1997

South Korea
FIFA World Cup fourth place: 2002
EAFF Championship: 2003

Individual
K League 1 Best XI: 1998, 1999
K League 1 Most Valuable Player: 1999
Korean FA Fans' Player of the Year: 2003

Entertainer

References

External links

 
 Ahn Jung-hwan – National Team Stats at KFA 
 
 

 
 Ahn Jung-hwan at cafe.daum.net

1976 births
Living people
South Korean television presenters
South Korean broadcasters
VJs (media personalities)
Dalian Shide F.C. players
Suwon Samsung Bluewings players
MSV Duisburg players
FC Metz players
Yokohama F. Marinos players
Shimizu S-Pulse players
A.C. Perugia Calcio players
Busan IPark players
Bundesliga players
Ligue 1 players
J1 League players
Serie A players
Chinese Super League players
K League 1 Most Valuable Player Award winners
K League 1 players
2000 CONCACAF Gold Cup players
2002 FIFA World Cup players
2004 AFC Asian Cup players
2006 FIFA World Cup players
2010 FIFA World Cup players
Association football forwards
Expatriate footballers in China
Expatriate footballers in Germany
Expatriate footballers in France
Expatriate footballers in Japan
Expatriate footballers in Italy
South Korean expatriate sportspeople in China
South Korean expatriate sportspeople in Germany
South Korean expatriate sportspeople in France
South Korean expatriate sportspeople in Japan
South Korean expatriate sportspeople in Italy
South Korean expatriate footballers
South Korea international footballers
South Korean footballers
People from Paju
Ajou University alumni
Universiade medalists in football
Universiade silver medalists for South Korea
Medalists at the 1997 Summer Universiade
Sportspeople from Gyeonggi Province